James Francis Hogan MP (29 December 1855 – 9 November 1924) was an Irish history professor at University College Cork, author and Member of Parliament for Mid Tipperary between 1893 and 1900.

Biography

Born in County Tipperary in 1855, to Rody and Mary Hogan, he had one sister, Margaret. He emigrated to Melbourne in 1856 and lived in Geelong, attending St. Mary's Catholic School there before a year at St Patrick's College, Melbourne. He graduated and began to teach in 1872. He began writing in local newspapers on Catholic topics, before later editing the Victorian Review. Joining he Victorian Catholic Young Men's Society in 1884 he admired the legacy of Daniel O'Connell and campaigned to erect a memorial to him. He published works on the Irish colonisation of Australia, including The Gladstone Colony: An Unwritten Chapter of Australian History and The Irish In Australian in the late 1890s.

He then returned to England, and in 1893 was elected unopposed to the House of Commons as MP for Mid Tipperary. He served as secretary of the Colonial Party under Sir Charles Dilke. Following retirement as an MP in 1900, he moved to Ireland to teach at the University of College, Cork.  There, he became associated with the Blueshirt movement, advocating a Christian democracy which clashed with the more right-wing aims of their leader Eoin O'Duffy.

He died from pneumonia and cancer in London on 9 November 1924. He remained unmarried at his death, and was survived by his sister.

Works
 The Convict King 
 The Gladstone Colony 
 The Irish in Australia 
 The Sisiter Dominion  
 The Australian in London and America 
 An Australian Christmas Collection 
 The Lost Explorer

References

External links 
 
 
 The Lost Explorer Read Chapter 1 online.
 

1855 births
1924 deaths
Politicians from County Tipperary
Members of the Parliament of the United Kingdom for County Tipperary constituencies (1801–1922)
Irish writers
19th-century Irish historians
20th-century Irish historians
Academics of University College Cork
Irish emigrants to colonial Australia
UK MPs 1892–1895
UK MPs 1895–1900
Anti-Parnellite MPs